James Thomas "Fireball" Bennett (September 8, 1919 – June 3, 1991) was an American baseball pitcher in the Negro leagues. He played with the Indianapolis–Cincinnati Clowns in 1945 and 1948.

He also played for the Indianapolis Lincolns in 1948 and 1949, an Indianapolis ABCs team (not to be confused with the earlier Indianapolis ABCs club) in 1949, and the Winona Chiefs in 1952.

References

External links
 and Seamheads

Indianapolis Clowns players
Cincinnati Clowns players
1919 births
1991 deaths
Baseball players from Kentucky
Baseball pitchers
20th-century African-American sportspeople